La 7 is a Spanish television channel, launched in 2009. It was founded and started to broadcast in 2009. CYLTV currently broadcasts in Spanish.

History
In 2008, the Junta de Castilla y León began the tender for the delivery of DTT broadcast licenses in the region, due to the fact that Castilla y León lacked regional television channels, unlike most of the Spanish autonomous communities.

On January 24, 2009, the two licenses were granted to the company Radio Televisión de Castilla y León.

The channel began its broadcasts on March 9, 2009, with the name CyL7 to invite the public to place it at number 7 on television following the logical channel number. In September 2011 the channel was renamed CyLTV. In 2019 the channel underwent another identity change, when it was renamed La 7, returning to one of the channel's original names.

Programming
La 7 broadcasts general programming, highlighting news and entertainment programs. The channel must also fulfill some public service functions since it acts as the regional television for Castilla y León despite being privately owned.

References

External links

2009 establishments in Spain
Mass media in Valladolid
Television stations in Spain
Television channels and stations established in 2009